PEG-150 hydrogenated jojoba is an ethoxylated version of fully hydrogenated jojoba wax and the most water soluble form of jojoba available. This versatile emollient functions as a secondary emulsifier and provides viscosity adjustments in hair care formulas and fragrance oil solubilization in aqueous solutions. PEG-150 Hydrogenated Jojoba is commonly used in cosmetics formulations.

Physical properties
Testing in a 5% aqueous solution shows that it has a neutral pH, high clarity in water, and low viscosity. The HLB value is approximately 18.

References
 [https://www.hallstar.com/product/florasolvs-jojoba-150/ 

Cosmetics chemicals